For the polo player, see Tommy Wayman

Thomas Wayman (26 October 1833 – 8 February 1901) was an English politician.

He was educated in private schools in Halifax. He carried on business as a wool-stapler until 1892. He was Mayor of Halifax from 1872 to 1874 and served as a Justice of the Peace in the borough. He was Liberal MP for nearby Elland from 1885 until he retired due to ill-health in 1899. He retired to Banbury, Oxfordshire, and died there on 8 February 1901, aged 67.

References

External links 
 

Liberal Party (UK) MPs for English constituencies
1833 births
1901 deaths
UK MPs 1885–1886
UK MPs 1886–1892
UK MPs 1892–1895
UK MPs 1895–1900